Ben Rich may refer to:
 Ben Rich (engineer), American engineer
 Ben Rich (weather forecaster), British meteorologist
 Ben E. Rich, missionary and spokesman for the Church of Jesus Christ of Latter-day Saints